U of J may refer to:

a university in Poland
 University of Johannesburg

a university in Sri Lanka
 University of Jaffna

a university in the United States
 University of Judaism (now the American Jewish University) of Los Angeles, California

See also
 UJ (disambiguation)